Roger Rocha Moreira (São Paulo, 12 September 1956) is a Brazilian musician. He is the guitarist, songwriter and singer of Ultraje a Rigor.

References

External links
 Roger Moreira at the Ultraje a Rigor official website

Brazilian guitarists
Brazilian male guitarists
Living people
Mensans
Conservatism in Brazil
1956 births
Musicians from São Paulo